Muhamed Useini (born 21 November 1988) is a Macedonian professional footballer who plays as a midfielder for Kosovan club SC Gjilani.

Club career

Flamurtari Vlorë
On 22 June 2017, Useini completed a transfer to Albanian club Flamurtari Vlorë by signing a one-year contract.

International career
In September 2011, Useini received a call-up for the UEFA Euro 2012 qualifying match against Russia and Andorra.UEFA Euro 2012 qualifying Group B He made his senior debut on 6 September, playing in the last 13 minutes of a 1–0 home win against Andorra. It proved to be his sole international appearance.

Honours
Rabotnički
Macedonian First Football League: 2013–14
Macedonian Football Cup: 2013–14

References

External links
 
 

1988 births
Living people
Macedonian Muslims
Macedonian footballers
Sportspeople from Tetovo
Association football midfielders
KF Shkëndija players
FK Rabotnički players
FK Renova players
Flamurtari Vlorë players
SC Gjilani players
Macedonian Second Football League players
Macedonian First Football League players
Kategoria Superiore players
Football Superleague of Kosovo players
North Macedonia international footballers
Macedonian expatriate footballers
Expatriate footballers in Albania
Macedonian expatriate sportspeople in Albania
Expatriate footballers in Kosovo
Macedonian expatriate sportspeople in Kosovo